Carlos Celestino Colás (December 4, 1917 – December 4, 1987) was a Cuban professional baseball catcher who played in the American Negro leagues in the 1940s and 1950s.

A native of Caimito del Guayabal, Cuba, Colás was the brother of fellow Negro leaguer José Colás. Older brother Carlos made his Negro leagues debut in 1940 with the New York Cubans, and played with New York again the following season. He then spent several years in the Mexican League, returning to the Negro leagues in 1949 to spend four seasons with the Memphis Red Sox before playing again in the Mexican League through the mid-1950s. Colás died in Havana, Cuba in 1987 on his 70th birthday.

References

External links
 and Seamheads
 Carlos Colás at Negro League Baseball Players Association

1917 births
1987 deaths
Memphis Red Sox players
New York Cubans players
20th-century African-American sportspeople
Baseball catchers